The Entail Act 1685 (c 26) [12mo ed: c 22] was an Act of the Parliament of Scotland. It was one of the Entail Acts.

This Act was disapplied by section 2 of the Entail (Scotland) Act 1914.

The whole Act was repealed by sections 76(2) of, and Part I of Schedule 13 to, the Abolition of Feudal Tenure etc. (Scotland) Act 2000 on 28 November 2004. See also sections 58, 62 and 75.

References
Halsbury's Statutes,

External links
The Entail Act 1685, as amended, from Legislation.gov.uk.

Acts of the Parliament of Scotland
1680s in Scotland
1685 in law